Michael Tönnies (19 December 1959 – 26 January 2017) was a German professional footballer who played as a striker.

Club career
Tönnies played in the (West) German top-flight for FC Schalke 04 and MSV Duisburg and scored in 40 matches 13 goals.

Personal life and death
Tönnies was known as a chainsmoker and was diagnosed with lung damage in 2005 and had a lung transplant in April 2013. He died in January 2017, aged 57, of unknown causes.

Honours
 Scorer of the second fastest hat-trick in Bundesliga history: six minutes (10th, 11th and 15th minute, 27 August 1991 in a 6–2 win against the Karlsruher SC, he scored five goals overall in that game). The performance was beaten by Robert Lewandowski on 22 September 2015.
 Second Fußball-Bundesliga 1990–91 top scorer: 29 goals.

References

External links
 

1959 births
2017 deaths
Footballers from Essen
Association football forwards
German footballers
Germany youth international footballers
FC Schalke 04 players
SpVgg Bayreuth players
1. FC Bocholt players
Rot-Weiss Essen players
MSV Duisburg players
Wuppertaler SV players
Bundesliga players
2. Bundesliga players
West German footballers